Events from the year 1644 in Denmark.

Incumbents 

 Monarch — Christian IV
 Steward of the Realm — Corfitz Ulfeldt

Events

Undated
 the Domus Anatomica anatomical theatre is completed.
 the Torstenson War breaks out between Denmark–Norway and Sweden. It was resolved by the Second Treaty of Brömsebro in 1645.

Torstenson War 
 9 January – the Battle of Kolding begins the Torstenson War.
 16 May – the Action of 16 May 1644.
 1 July – the Battle of Colberger Heide.
 13 October – the Battle of Frehmarn.
 22 December – the Battle of Bysjön.

Births 
 18 March – Oliger Paulli, merchant and publisher (died 1714)
 26 March – Berte Skeel, noblewoman (died 1720)
 21 April – Conrad von Reventlow, Grand Chancellor of Denmark (died 1708)
 25 September – Ole Rømer, astronomer (died 1710)

Deaths 
 20 February – Jens Bang, merchant (born c. 1575)
 13 October – Pros Mund, admiral (born c. 1589)
 18 December – Leonhard Blasius, architect (born in the Netherlands)

Date unknown 
 October – Corfits Ulfeldt, naval officer (born c. 1600)

Gallery

References

External links

 
Denmark
Years of the 17th century in Denmark